Air Force Network (AFNet) is an Indian Air Force (IAF) owned, operated and managed digital information grid. The AFNet replaces the Indian Air Force's (IAF) old communication network set-up using the tropo-scatter technology of the 1950s making it a true net-centric combat force. The IAF project is part of the overall mission to network all three services, that is The Indian Army, The Indian Navy and The Indian Air Force. The former Defence Minister AK Antony inaugurated the IAF's the AFNET  on 14 September 2010 dedicating it to the people of India, for their direct or indirect participation in the communication revolution.

Background
Armed Forces in India has been using troposcatters as primary means of military communications since the 1950s, thereby occupying huge and expensive 2G and 3G spectrums which otherwise could have been used for expanding and de-clogging the civilian wireless communication network. The rapid expansion of civilian mobile telephony leading to need for larger bandwidth for wireless communication and commercial need to operate the 3G network necessitated the Government of India to have the Indian Armed Forces vacate the spectrum occupied by them. Thus the government of India through Department of Telecommunication (DoT) started a project called "Network for Spectrum" to set up a fiber optics network for the exclusive use of Indian Armed Forces in exchange for spectrum being released by the Defence Forces. The aim of 'Network for Spectrum' being twofold - to facilitate the growth of national tele-density on the one hand, and ensuring modernization of defence communications with the state-of-the-art communication infrastructure, and to support net-centric military operations.

The Department of Telecom and the Ministry of Defence signed the memorandum of understanding for vacating the spectrum and setting up dedicated network for the use of defence forces. In this MoU, DoT agreed to laying of 40,000 route kilometres of optical fibre cable connecting 219 Army stations, 33 Navy stations and 162 points for the Air Force. It further agreed to setting up an exclusive defence band and Defence Interest Zone along 100 km of the international border, where spectrum will be reserved only for use by the Armed Forces. The total cost of implementing "Network for Spectrum" project is estimated to be  10,000 crores.  AFNet is Indian Air Force component of Digital Information Grid under "Network for Spectrum" project and the AFNet is likely to be extended and connected to the Digital Information Grid Project under implementation for the Indian Navy and the Indian Army by 2015.

Project Origin
The Air Force Network (AFNet) has been developed by the Indian Air Force at a cost of 1,077 crore in collaboration with HCL Technologies and Bharat Sanchar Nigam Limited. It will replace the Air Force's more than half-a-century-old telecom network. This project is part of the defence ministry's initiative to digitize the communication systems of the three armed forces under "Network for Spectrum" initiative to improve coordination among themselves and other Military and Strategic Institution. 
IAF was the first to complete this gigabyte digital information grid implemented under the AFNet project. AFnet was inaugurated and dedicated to people of India on 14 September 2010 by the Defence Minister Shri AK Antony in presence of Union Minister of Communication & IT Shri A Raja, Marshal of the Air Force Arjan Singh, Chief of the Air Staff, Chief of the Army Staff and other officials from the three services and members of the Industry. AFNet will be connected and extended to a Unified Digital Grid encompassing all the legs of Indian Armed Forces.

Technology, Design & Structure
AFNet incorporates the latest traffic transportation technology in form of IP (Internet Protocol) packets over the network using Multi Protocol Label Switching (MPLS). A large VoIP (Voice over Internet Protocol) layer with stringent quality of service enforcement will facilitate robust, high quality voice, video and conferencing solutions.

Integrated Air Command and Control System (IACCS), an automated command and control system for Air Defence (AD) operations will ride the AFNet backbone integrating all ground-based and airborne sensors, AD weapon systems and C2 nodes. Subsequent integration with other services networks and civil radars will provide an integrated Air Situation Picture to operators to carry out Air Defence role.

AFNet will prove to be an effective force multiplier for intelligence analysis, mission planning and control, post-mission feedback and related activities like maintenance, logistics and administration. A comprehensive design with multi-layer security precautions for “Defence in Depth” have been planned by incorporating encryption technologies, Intrusion Prevention Systems to ensure the resistance of the IT system against information manipulation and eavesdropping. The network is secured with a host of advanced state-of-the-art encryption technologies. It is designed for high reliability with redundancy built into the network design itself.

The AFNet is also capable of transmitting video from unmanned surveillance aircraft (UAV), pictures from airborne warning and control systems (AWACS) to decision makers on the ground and providing intelligence inputs from remote areas.

The AFNet is also expected to facilitate accelerated economic growth by providing radio frequency spectrum for telecommunication purposes. AFNET will be the largest Multi-protocol Label Switching (MPLS) network in the defence segment.

Demonstration
At the AFNet launch, the IAF showcased a practice interception of simulated enemy targets by a pair of Mig-29 fighter aircraft airborne from an advanced airbase in the Punjab sector using the gigabyte digital information grid. During the AFNet-assisted operations, the Indian fighter jets neutralised intruding targets in the western sector, which was played out live on the giant screens at the Air Force auditorium offering a glimpse of the harnessed potential of the system. The final orders for engaging the enemy targets were issued live by Antony, whose queries about how the operation went was responded to by the pilot as "excellent".

Various other functionalities contributing towards Network Centric Warfare were also showcased. These consisted of facilitating video from Unmanned Aerial Vehicle (UAV), pictures from an AWACS aircraft to the decision-makers on ground sitting hundreds of kilometres away, providing intelligence inputs from far-flung areas at central locations seamlessly. This was possible mainly with the robust networking platform provided by AFNet.

Integrated Air Command and Control System
Integrated Air Command and Control System (IACCS) is an automated command and control system for AD planned by the Indian Air Force. IACCS operations will ride the AFNET backbone integrating all ground-based and airborne sensors, air defense (AD) weapon systems and command and control (C2) nodes. Subsequent integration with other services networks and civil radars will provide an integrated Air Situation Picture to operators to carry out AD role.

Through the IACCS, IAF will connect all of its space, air and ground assets quickly, for total awareness of a region. This will offer connectivity for all the ground platforms and airborne platforms, as a part of the network centricity of IAF. The IACCS also facilitates real-time transport of images, data and voice, amongst satellites, aircraft and ground stations.

References 

Indian Air Force
Military equipment of India
Military technology
Military communications
Computer networks